Hartford Castle is the ruins of a 19th-century residence located near Hartford, Illinois. The official name of the home was Lakeview. It was constructed by a French immigrant named Benjamin Biszant for his English bride in 1897.

Sources

External links
 Hartford Castle at the Legends and Lore of Illinois
 http://dailyabuse.typepad.com/odd_midwest/2005/04/the_first_trip_.html

Buildings and structures in Madison County, Illinois